Lincoln County (standard abbreviation: LC) is a county located in the U.S. state of Kansas. As of the 2020 census, the county population was 2,939. The largest city and county seat is Lincoln Center.

History

For many millennia, the Great Plains of North America was inhabited by nomadic Native Americans.  From the 16th century to 18th century, the Kingdom of France claimed ownership of large parts of North America.  In 1762, after the French and Indian War, France secretly ceded New France to Spain, per the Treaty of Fontainebleau.  In 1802, Spain returned most of the land to France, but keeping title to about 7,500 square miles.  In 1803, most of the land for modern day Kansas was acquired by the United States from France as part of the 828,000 square mile Louisiana Purchase for 2.83 cents per acre.

In 1854, the Kansas Territory was organized, then in 1861 Kansas became the 34th U.S. state.  In 1867, Lincoln County was established.

Lincoln county is among those in Kansas that are part of the depopulation of the Great Plains.

Geography

Adjacent counties
 Mitchell County (north)
 Ottawa County (east)
 Saline County (southeast)
 Ellsworth County (south)
 Russell County (west)
 Osborne County (northwest)

Demographics

As of the census of 2000, there were 3,578 people, 1,529 households, and 1,039 families residing in the county.  The population density was 5 people per square mile (2/km2).  There were 1,853 housing units at an average density of 3 per square mile (1/km2).  The racial makeup of the county was 98.30% White, 0.11% Black or African American, 0.48% Native American, 0.11% Asian, 0.25% from other races, and 0.75% from two or more races.  1.03% of the population were Hispanic or Latino of any race.

There were 1,529 households, out of which 27.10% had children under the age of 18 living with them, 58.10% were married couples living together, 6.40% had a female householder with no husband present, and 32.00% were non-families. 29.60% of all households were made up of individuals, and 16.40% had someone living alone who was 65 years of age or older.  The average household size was 2.29 and the average family size was 2.81.

In the county, the population was spread out, with 23.50% under the age of 18, 5.50% from 18 to 24, 22.90% from 25 to 44, 24.60% from 45 to 64, and 23.50% who were 65 years of age or older.  The median age was 44 years. For every 100 females there were 96.20 males.  For every 100 females age 18 and over, there were 92.40 males.

The median income for a household in the county was $30,893, and the median income for a family was $36,538. Males had a median income of $24,681 versus $20,000 for females. The per capita income for the county was $15,788.  About 7.30% of families and 9.70% of the population were below the poverty line, including 11.70% of those under age 18 and 10.00% of those age 65 or over.

Government

Presidential elections
Lincoln county is heavily Republican. Lyndon B. Johnson was the last Democrat to lose the county by less than 5%, and the last democrat to win the county was Franklin D. Roosevelt back in 1936.

Laws
Following amendment to the Kansas Constitution in 1986, the county remained a prohibition, or "dry", county until 1990, when voters approved the sale of alcoholic liquor by the individual drink with a 30% food sales requirement.

Education

Unified school districts
 Lincoln USD 298
 Sylvan–Lucas USD 299

Communities

Cities
 Barnard
 Beverly
 Lincoln Center
 Sylvan Grove

Unincorporated communities
 Ash Grove
 Denmark
 Vesper

Townships
Lincoln County is divided into twenty townships.  None of the cities within the county are considered governmentally independent, and all figures for the townships include those of the cities.  In the following table, the population center is the largest city (or cities) included in that township's population total, if it is of a significant size.

See also
 National Register of Historic Places listings in Lincoln County, Kansas

References

Further reading

 ; 123 pages.
 
 Standard Atlas of Lincoln County, Kansas; Geo. A. Ogle & Co; 72 pages; 1918.
 Plat Book of Lincoln County, Kansas; North West Publishing Co; 39 pages; 1901.

External links

County
 
 Lincoln County - Directory of Public Officials
Maps
 Lincoln County Maps: Current, Historic, KDOT
 Kansas Highway Maps: Current, Historic, KDOT
 Kansas Railroad Maps: Current, 1996, 1915, KDOT and Kansas Historical Society

 
Kansas counties
1867 establishments in Kansas
Populated places established in 1867